Warrensville Heights is a city located in Cuyahoga County, Ohio, United States. It is an East Side suburb of Cleveland. The population was 13,789 at the 2020 U.S. Census.

Geography
Warrensville Heights is located at  (41.438653, -81.523262).

Demographics

According to the 2021 American Community Survey, Warrensville Heights has the largest percentage of Black residents of all cities and villages in Ohio, with 92.8% identifying as Black or African-American.

2010 U.S. Census
As of the 2010 United States Census of 2010, there were 13,542 people, 6,043 households, and 3,696 families living in the city. The racial makeup of the city was 3.6% White, 93.5% African American, 0.2% Native American, 0.3% Asian, 0.4% from other races and 2.0% from two or more races. Hispanic or Latino people of any race were 1.4% of the population.

There were 6,043 households, of which 31.7% had children under the age of 18 living with them, 24.5% were married couples living together, 31.8% had a female householder with no husband present, 4.9% had a male householder with no wife present, and 38.8% were non-families. 35.8% of all households were made up of individuals, and 12.8% had someone living alone who was 65 years of age or older. The average household size was 2.22 and the average family size was 2.84.

The median age in the city was 39.2 years. 24.5% of residents were under the age of 18; 9.6% were between the ages of 18 and 24; 22.1% were from 25 to 44; 26.3% were from 45 to 64; and 17.5% were 65 years of age or older. The gender makeup of the city was 42.7% male and 57.3% female.

2000 U.S. Census
As of the 2000 United States Census of 2000, there were 15,109 people, 6,325 households, and 4,048 families living in the city. The population density was 3,661.4 people per square mile (1,412.5/km). There were 6,741 housing units at an average density of 1,633.5 per square mile (630.2/km). The racial makeup of the city was 10.57% White or European American, 90.41% African American, 0.17% Native American, 0.91% Asian, 0.04% Pacific Islander, 0.32% from other races and 1.58% from two or more races. Hispanic or Latino people of any race were 0.75% of the population.

There were 6,325 households, out of which 28.6% had children under the age of 18 living with them, 32.2% were married couples living together, 27.7% had a female householder with no husband present, and 36.0% were non-families. 32.4% of all households were made up of individuals, and 9.2% had someone living alone who was 65 years of age or older. The average household size was 2.34 and the average family size was 2.95.

In the city, the population was spread out, with 25.6% under the age of 18, 7.9% from 18 to 24, 26.6% from 25 to 44, 25.5% from 45 to 64, and 14.4% who were 65 years of age or older. The median age was 38 years. For every 100 females, there were 73.7 males. For every 100 females age 18 and over, there were 66.8 males.

The median income for a household in the city was $33,204, and the median income for a family was $41,962. Males had a median income of $35,947 versus $24, 234 for females. The per capita income for the city was $18,611. About 10.4% of families and 11.4% of the population were below the poverty line, including 16.2% of those under age 18 and 9.8% of those age 65 or over.

Education
The City of Warrensville Heights is served by the Warrensville Heights City School District, which has four campuses and an enrollment of approximately 1,600 students.

In 2015, the Ohio University Heritage College of Osteopathic Medicine opened a branch on the campus of Cleveland Clinic South Pointe Hospital for 50 medical students.

References

External links

 City website

Cities in Cuyahoga County, Ohio
Cities in Ohio